"The Old Lamp-Lighter" is a popular song. The music was written by Nat Simon, the lyrics by Charles Tobias.  The song was published in 1946.

Background
The lyrics sentimentalize and memorialize the profession of lamplighters, who walked city streets at dusk turning on the gas-powered streetlamps and turned them off again at dawn.

1946 versions
Several versions of the song made the best-seller charts in 1946-1947. The most popular recording, by Sammy Kaye (vocal by Billy Williams), was released by RCA Victor Records as catalog number 20-1963. It first reached the Billboard Best Seller chart on November 8, 1946, and lasted 14 weeks on the chart, peaking at number one.

A recording by Kay Kyser (vocal by Mike Douglas and Campus Kids) was released by Columbia Records as catalog number 37095. It first reached the Billboard Best Seller chart on November 22, 1946, and lasted 11 weeks on the chart, peaking at number three. A recording by Hal Derwin was released by Capitol Records as catalog number 288. It first reached the Billboard Best Seller chart on December 6, 1946, and lasted two weeks on the chart, peaking at number six. This was Derwin's only charted hit.

The Browns version
In 1960, the song was a major country-pop hit for The Browns, released as a single early that year. It went on to become a major top-ten hit, spending 15 weeks on the US Billboard Hot 100 chart, peaking at No. 5, while reaching No. 20 on Billboards Hot C&W Sides, and No. 17 on Billboards Hot R&B Sides.

Other versions
Slim Whitman included the song on his album Just Call Me Lonesome (1961)
The song was performed under the name Luktar-Gvendur, by the Icelandic singer Björk on the album Gling-Gló, in 1990. On that album Björk teams up with the jazz trio of Guðmundur Ingólfsson: consisting of Guðmundur Ingólfsson on piano, Guðmundur Steingrímsson on drums and Þórður Högnason on bass. The album has become one of the classics of Icelandic contemporary pop music albums.

Use in Movies
The song was sung by Gene Autry in the movie "Twilight on the Rio Grande" which first appeared in theaters on April 1, 1947.

See also
List of number-one singles of 1947 (U.S.)
The Old Dope Peddler

References

Songs about occupations
1946 songs
1946 singles
1960 singles
Songs with music by Nat Simon
Songs written by Charles Tobias
The Browns songs
Song recordings produced by Chet Atkins